Li Maoxun was a warlord late in the Chinese dynasty Tang dynasty, who seized control of Lulong Circuit (盧龍, headquartered in modern Beijing) briefly from 875 to 876 before retiring and turning control of the circuit over to his son Li Keju.

Background 
It is not known when Li Maoxun was born, but it was known that he was ethnically Huigu, of the Abusi tribe.  During the governance of Lulong's military governor Zhang Zhongwu (in office 841–849), Zhang waged many campaigns against the Huigu, and in one of the campaigns, Li Maoxun surrendered along with the other nobles of the tribe, and was granted a Chinese name, along with the imperial clan surname of Li.  It was said that he was capable in riding and archery, and was much favored by Zhang, who often sent him on border campaigns.

Seizure of Lulong Circuit 
As of 875, Zhang Gongsu (not related to Zhang Zhongwu) was the military governor, and it was said that the soldiers despised him for his harshness and violence.  Instead, the soldiers hoped that the officer Chen Gongyan, who was then the defender of Naxiang Base (納降軍, in modern Beijing), would take over.  The ambitious Li Maoxun, instead, assassinated Chen, took his army, and headed toward the circuit capital You Prefecture, claiming to be Chen's forward commander against Zhang.  Zhang engaged him and was defeated, and Zhang fled to the imperial capital Chang'an.  Once Li entered You Prefecture, the people realized that he was not acting on Chen's behalf, but given that he had the prefecture under control by this time, they were forced to support him.  Then-reigning Emperor Xizong thus commissioned Li as the acting military governor, and then as full military governor.

Retirement 
In spring 876, Li Maoxun requested retirement and requested that his son Li Keju be made acting military governor.  Emperor Xizong agreed, and allowed Li Maoxun to retire while making Li Keju acting military governor and later full military governor.  That was the last historical reference to Li Maoxun, and it is not known when he died — although he presumably died long before his son Li Keju, facing the mutiny by his officer Li Quanzhong, committed suicide along with his entire family, in 885.

Notes and references 

 Old Book of Tang, vol. 180.
 New Book of Tang, vol. 212.
 Zizhi Tongjian, vol. 252.

9th-century births
9th-century deaths
Tang dynasty jiedushi of Lulong Circuit
Uyghur people
People from North China